Tamara Hejtan (circa 1340 - died after 1378) was a Bulgarian princess, the daughter of the Bulgarian Emperor Ivan Alexander and his second wife Sarah-Theodora.

Life
Kera Tamara was a sister of Ivan Shishman and Ivan Sratsimir.  She was born probably around 1340 and originates from the Shishman dynasty.

The first husband of Kera Tamara was despot Constantine. According to one theory he was the despot of Velbazhd Constantine Dragash whose daughter Helena Dragash married the Byzantine Emperor Manuel II and became mother of the last Byzantine Emperor Constantine XI. However, that theory has been dismissed by the historians because in 1371 Kera Tamara was already a widow while Constantine Dragash died in 1395. Therefore, despot Constantine who was depicted in the Tetraevangelia of Ivan Alexander next to the Bulgarian princess was another man.

As early as 1371 when Ivan Alexander died and Ivan Shishman inherited the throne, in the capital Tarnovo arrived ambassadors from the Ottoman Sultan Murad I to arrange his relations with the new Emperor of Bulgaria. The Sultan who was obviously familiar with the beauty of Kera Tamara and the fact that she was a widow demanded her to become his wife as a guarantee for the peace between the two counties. Ivan Shishman managed to divert his demand and prolonged his decision for seven years. On that occasion an anonymous Bulgarian chronicle from the 15th century records:

However, in 1378 when his attempts to stop the Turks failed, Ivan Shishman reluctantly sent Kera Tamara in the harem of the Sultan in the Ottoman capital Bursa. She kept her Christian faith. In the Boril Synadnik her fate was praised as a self-sacrifice:

The grave of Kera Tamara remains today in Bursa in the family tomb of the Ottoman dynasty next to the grave of Murad I and the visitor know it as the place of "the Bulgarian Empress Maria". According to Kera Tamara's will, her tomb remained uncovered and barley was sowed on her grave.

Sources

 Queens of Tarnovo, Plamen Pavlov, 2006

14th-century births
14th-century deaths
14th-century Bulgarian people
14th-century consorts of Ottoman sultans
Bulgarian people of Jewish descent
Bulgarian princesses
14th-century Bulgarian women
Daughters of emperors